The R396 road is a regional road in Ireland, located in County Longford and County Westmeath.

References

Regional roads in the Republic of Ireland
Roads in County Longford
Roads in County Westmeath